Langkawi, officially known by its sobriquet Langkawi, the Jewel of Kedah, is a duty-free island and an archipelago of 99 islands (plus five small islands visible only at low tide in the Strait of Malacca) located some 30 km off the coast of northwestern Malaysia and a few kilometres south of Ko Tarutao, adjacent to the Thai border. Politically, it is an administrative district of Kedah, with Kuah as its largest town. Pantai Cenang is the island's most popular beach and tourist area.

Etymology

The name Langkawi is thought to have existed by the early 15th century, although in the 16th century the island of Langkawi was also marked on maps variously as Langa, Langka, Lansura, and Langapura.

There are many suggestions for the origin of the name of Langkawi. According to one interpretation, Langkawi means island of the reddish-brown eagle, a Brahminy kite in colloquial Malay. This interpretation was used to create the landmark sculpture of an eagle as the symbol of Langkawi at Dataran Helang (Eagle Square) in Kuah.

Some believed that Langkawi is the same as, or related to, the Lanka or Langkapuri mentioned in Indian sources. The name Langkawi is also thought to be related to Langkasuka, an old kingdom believed to have links with Kedah. Some also thought that Langkawi means "many beautiful islands",  being a Sanskrit word meaning "beautiful" while  means "many".

History
Langkawi had long been at the periphery of, but closely associated with, the domain of the Kedah Sultanate. Legend tells of a great snake ular besar,  the custodian of the Langkawi Islands, to which a new king of Kedah must sacrifice a virgin daughter whenever he ascended the throne, or when war was declared with another state.

The island of Langkawi was recorded in history by various travellers to the region. It was called Lóngyápútí in the 14th century by the Yuan dynasty traveller Wang Dayuan. In the 15th century, it was known to the Acehnese as Pulau Lada ('Pepper Island'). In 1691, the French general Augustin de Beaulieu recorded going to the island of "Lancahui" (Langkawi) to buy pepper, and de Beaulieu was required to obtain a license from Kedah's heir apparent then in Perlis before the penghulu or chief of Langkawi would sell pepper to him.

Langkawi was historically home to Austronesian peoples, such as the orang laut or sea people originally from the southern part of the Malay Peninsula and Malay people.  It had been thought to be cursed for a couple of centuries. According to local legend, in the late 18th century, a woman named Mahsuri was wrongfully accused of adultery and put to death. Before she died, she placed a curse on the island that would last for seven generations. Not long after Mahsuri's death, in 1821, the Siamese army invaded Kedah and attacked Langkawi.  In the first attack, the locals burned down the granary at Padang Matsirat to starve the Siamese army. The Siamese nevertheless captured the island in May 1822, killed its leaders, and took many islanders as slaves, while others fled. Before the Siamese invasion, there was an estimated island population of 3,000–5,000, but only a small proportion was left after the invasion.

The island was recaptured from the Siamese in 1837.  In 1840–1841, the Sultan of Kedah, who went into exile after the Siamese attacks, was allowed to return by the Siamese. Langkawi islands' population recovered afterwards.  However, the Orang Laut who fled after the Siamese attacks did not return.  In 1909, the islands came under British rule following the Anglo-Siamese Treaty of 1909.  The middle of the channel between Tarutao National Park and Langkawi became the Siamese border, with Tarutao to the north forming part of Siam, while the Langkawi islands to the south came under British rule. During the World War II, Siam took control briefly as British Malaya fell to the Japanese.

Langkawi was a haven for pirates who attacked junks in the northern part of the Strait of Malacca. In a series of operations, between December 1945 and March 1946, the British cleared the pirates' land bases on Langkawi and Tarutao.  The British continued to rule until Malaya gained its independence in 1957.

Langkawi remained a quiet backwater until 1986, when Prime Minister Mahathir Mohamad transformed it into a major tourist resort, helping to plan many of the islands' buildings himself. Mahsuri's seven-generation curse was said to have lifted as a seventh generation descendant of Mahsuri was born in the Thai province of Phuket. The island rapidly grew as a tourist destination, and by 2012, it received over three million tourists a year.

Geography 

The coastal areas consist of flat, alluvial plains punctuated with limestone ridges. Two-thirds of the island is dominated by forest-covered mountains, hills, and natural vegetation.

The island's oldest geological formation, the Machinchang Formation, was the first part of Southeast Asia to rise from the seabed in the Cambrian more than half a billion years ago. The oldest part of the formation is observable at Teluk Datai to the northwest of the island, where the exposed outcrop consists of mainly sandstone (quartzite) in the upper parts and shale and mudstone in the lower parts of the sequence. The best exposure of Cambrian rocks (541 to 485 Ma) in Malaysia is the Machinchang Formation, composed of quartzose clastic rock formations, in Langkawi; the other known example, the Jerai Formation, emerges near the west coast of Kedah on the mainland (peninsula). Geologically, all these rocks are in the Western Belt of peninsular Malaysia, which is thought to be part of the Shan–Thai Terrane.

Climate 

Langkawi features a tropical monsoon climate (Köppen climate classification (Am) ) Langkawi has a short dry season from December until February. March to November is a long rainy season.

Government and Politics

Langkawi Municipal Council, officially known as the Tourism City of Langkawi Municipal Council (MPLBP) and formerly known as the Langkawi District Council from 29 April 1987 until 23 March 2001, is the local authority of Langkawi.

Administrative divisions

Langkawi District is divided into 6 mukims, which are:
 Ayer Hangat
 Bohor
 Kedawang
 Kuah
 Padang Matsirat
 Ulu Melaka

Demographics

Only four of the 99 islands are inhabited: Langkawi (the main island), Tuba, Rebak and Dayang Bunting. The population is approximately 99,000, around 65,000 of them in Langkawi, of which 90% are Malays.  The other ethnic groups consist mainly of Chinese, Indians, and Thais.

Islam is practised primarily by ethnic Malays. Other major religions are Hinduism (mainly among Indians), Buddhism (mainly among Chinese and Thai), and Christianity (mostly Chinese).

Standard Malay is the official language. English is widely spoken and understood by the locals. Most natives speak a Langkawi variant of Kedah Malay, with minorities also speaking Chinese, Tamil and Siamese.

Federal Parliament and State Assembly Seats 

Langkawi district representatives in the Federal Parliament of Malaysia

List of Langkawi district representatives in the state legislative assemblies

Tourism

On 1 June 2007, Langkawi Island was given a World Geopark status by UNESCO. Three of its main conservation areas in Langkawi Geopark are Machincang Cambrian Geoforest Park, Kilim Karst Geoforest Park, and Dayang Bunting Marble Geoforest park (Island of the Pregnant Maiden Lake). These three parks are the most popular tourism area within Langkawi Geopark. In 2014, UNESCO issued a "yellow card" warning threatening the status of the Geopark.

Cable car and Sky Bridge

The Langkawi Cable Car takes visitors up to the peak of Gunung Mat Chinchang, where the Langkawi Sky Bridge is located. The Sky Bridge was closed in 2012 for maintenance and upgrading but reopened in February 2015.  An inclined lift called SkyGlide that would take visitors from the top station to the Sky Bridge was completed in late 2015.

The start of the cable car ride is located in the Oriental Village where there are several attractions, including a 3-Dimensional art museum known as Art in Paradise.

The Kilim Karst Geoforest Park (The Kilim River)

The Kilim Karst Geoforest Park is a mangrove forest park which consists of limestone caves and interconnected three river estuaries that stretch from Kisap village approximately 10 km to Tanjung Rhu. Bats, crocodiles, eagles, kingfishers, monitor lizards, macaques, otters, snakes and tree crabs are some of the most commonly found wildlifes in the park.

MAHA Tower Langkawi

MAHA Tower is a tower in Kuah, it is the latest addition, also part of the Langkawi City's project. The tower is approximately 1.40 km to Dataran Lang.

Relic of Mahsuri

Relic of Mahsuri in Wings by Croske Resort Langkawi at Padang Matsirat, recorded the ancient history and story of Langkawi, is part of the State Government of Kedah's Safe Langkawi project. The hand crafted featured stone wall is 200 meter to Langkawi International Airport .

Transportation

The island of Langkawi can be reached by sea and air. The Langkawi Jetty Point connects the island to main destinations like Kuala Perlis, Kuala Kedah, Penang and Tamalang. There's also ferry service to Satun town and to Ko Lipe island in Thailand. The ferry between Langkawi and Ko Lipe operates from October until June. The departure/arrival point in Langkawi is at Kuah Jetty, Langkawi and Telaga Harbour, Langkawi. The departure/arrival point in Ko Lipe is at Pattaya Beach. As there is no pier in Ko Lipe, transfers to the beach are done with local long-tail boats. The journey takes about 1 hour and 30 minutes.

Langkawi International Airport is one of seven international airports in Malaysia and connects the island to Kuala Lumpur, Singapore, Penang and Subang.

International relations

Twin towns – Sister cities
Langkawi currently has two sister cities:

See also 
 Langkawi International Maritime and Aerospace Exhibition
 Langkawi Island bent-toed gecko

References

External links

 Official Langkawi Website
 Tourism Malaysia - Langkawi
 Official Langkawi Tourism Site

 
Global Geoparks Network members
Northern Corridor Economic Region
Geoparks in Malaysia
Islands of the Strait of Malacca